Arlette Dorgère (born Anna Mathilde Irma Jouve, 8 June 1880 – 1965) was a French actress, dancer and singer. Dorgère appeared in dozens of plays throughout her career. She is represented on a large number of postcards of the Belle Époque. She was also a popular model for posters. 

While she was a lead dancer for the Scala in 1904, she purchased the castle of Vigneux-sur-Seine, which was so named at the beginning of 20th century castle by Dorgère II. She resold her property the castle in 1929 to settle in Morocco. In 1958, she married Louis Margerie in Monaco and died there in 1965. Along with her theatre career Dorgère also modeled for a time. She appeared in multiple French magazines.

Theatre appearances

References

External links

1880 births
French stage actresses
Actresses from Paris
1965 deaths
Belle Époque